Leburnick is a hamlet near Lawhitton (where the 2011 population is included.) in Cornwall, England.

References

Hamlets in Cornwall